The Devils Racecourse Formation is a geologic formation in Jamaica. The limestones of the formation preserve rudist, bivalve, coral, foraminifera and algae fossils dating back to the Hauterivian stage of the Cretaceous period.

See also 
 List of fossiliferous stratigraphic units in Jamaica

References

Further reading 
 H. Löser, T. A. Stemann, and S. Mitchell. 2009. Oldest scleractinian fauna from Jamaica (Hauterivian, Benbow Inlier). Journal of Paleontology 83(3):333-349

Geologic formations of Jamaica
Cretaceous Jamaica
Hauterivian Stage
Limestone formations
Shallow marine deposits
Formations